Said Mahdi Soilihi Kafe (1937 – May 25, 2002) was a Comorian political figure in the regime of Ahmed Abdallah. He served as finance minister from 1978 until 1982, and foreign minister from 1982 to 1990. He left office soon after the 1989 coup in which Abdallah was killed. He was born on Mayotte and died in Paris, France.

1937 births
2002 deaths
People from Mayotte
Finance ministers of the Comoros
Foreign ministers of the Comoros
Government ministers of the Comoros